Spencer Wirth-Davis, better known by his stage name Big Cats (sometimes styled Big Cats!), is an American underground hip hop producer from Minneapolis, Minnesota. He has produced full-length collaboration albums with artists such as Guante, The Tribe, and Toki Wright.

References

External links 
 Official website

Year of birth missing (living people)
American hip hop record producers
Musicians from Minneapolis
Living people